Pandæmonium (or Pandemonium in some versions of English) is the capital of Hell in John Milton's epic poem Paradise Lost.

The name stems from the Greek pan (παν), meaning 'all' or 'every', and daimónion (δαιμόνιον), a diminutive form meaning 'little spirit', 'little angel', or, as Christians interpreted it, 'little daemon', and later, 'demon'. Pandæmonium thus roughly translates as "All Demons"—but can also be interpreted as Pandemoneios (Παν-δαιμον-ειον), or 'all-demon-place'.

John Milton invented the name for the capital of Hell, "the High Capital, of Satan and his Peers," built by the fallen angels at the suggestion of Mammon at the end of Book I of Paradise Lost (1667). It was designed by the architect Mulciber, who had been the designer of palaces in Heaven before his fall. (In Roman times, Mulciber was another name for the Roman god Vulcan.) Book II begins with the debate among the "Stygian Council" in the council-chamber of Pandæmonium. The demons built it in about an hour, but it far surpassed all human palaces or dwellings; it was probably quite small, however, as its spacious hall is described as being very crowded with the thronging swarm of demons, who were taller than any human man, until at a signal they were shrunk from their titanic size to less than "smallest dwarfs". It was also reputed to be made of solid gold.

See also
 Dis
 Inferno

External links 
 

Fictional populated places
Hell (Christianity)
Hell in popular culture